East Olympos, or Anatolikos Olympos, is a former municipality in Pieria regional unit, Greece. In Greece's 2011 local government reform East Olympos became a municipal unit of the municipality Dion-Olympos. The seat of the former East Olympos municipality was in Leptokarya.

The current East Olympos municipal unit consists of the following communities (constituent villages in parentheses):
Leptokarya
Panteleimonas (Palaios Panteleimonas, Neos Panteleimonas, Paralia Panteleimonos)
Platamon
Poroi (Neoi Poroi, Agios Dimitrios, Poroi)
Skotina (Skotina, Ano Skotina, Paralia Skotinis)

References

Populated places in Pieria (regional unit)
Mount Olympus